La seconda notte di nozze (internationally released as The Second Wedding Night) is an Italian comedy-drama film directed by Pupi Avati. It entered the 2005 Venice Film Festival. For this film Katia Ricciarelli won Nastro d'Argento for Best Actress.

Cast 
Antonio Albanese: Giordano Ricci
Neri Marcorè: Nino Ricci
Katia Ricciarelli: Lilliana Vespero
Angela Luce: Suntina Ricci
Marisa Merlini: Eugenia Ricci
Toni Santagata: Ugo Di Dante

References

External links

Italian comedy-drama films
Films directed by Pupi Avati
Films scored by Riz Ortolani
2005 comedy-drama films
2000s Italian-language films
2000s Italian films
 Films set in the 1940s